The Andover–Exeter rivalry (also known as the Exeter–Andover rivalry) is an academic and athletic rivalry between Phillips Academy (Andover) and Phillips Exeter Academy (Exeter), bearing many similarities of tradition and practice (as well as athletes) to the Harvard–Yale rivalry. Exeter traditionally educated its students for Harvard, much as Andover traditionally educated its students for Yale (despite being in the same state as Harvard). Today, Phillipians and Exonians continue to matriculate in large numbers to both Harvard and Yale, as well as many other top universities. The athletic rivalry between these two schools began with baseball, and football soon followed the same year. Today the two schools face each other in several sports every fall, winter, and spring trimester. The rivalry is America's earliest between preparatory schools. The two schools were also two of the three schools (the other, Lawrenceville), who became the three first schools in the United States to form secondary school lacrosse teams in 1882. Similar prep school traditions include the Episcopal–Woodberry rivalry and the Blair–Peddie rivalry.

History 
Exeter defeated Andover 12–1 in the first ever baseball game played between these two academies on May 22, 1878. Andover, in turn, defeated Exeter 22–0 in football on November 2, 1878. One of Exeter's most memorable football games took place in 1913 with a 59–0 victory over Andover. One of Andover's most memorable football games took place more recently, when Andover reciprocated with a matching 59–0 victory over Exeter in 1952. The current teams are coached by Panos Voulgaris (Exeter) and Trey Brown (Andover).

Football matches

References

External links 
 Phillips Exeter Academy web site
 Phillips Academy web site

High school sports rivalries in the United States
Phillips Exeter Academy
Phillips Academy